Daniel Bell (born 28 September 1994) is a South African field hockey player who plays as a defender for Belgian Hockey League club Royal Daring and the South African national team.

He competed in the 2020 Summer Olympics.

Club career
Bell moved to Europe in 2016 to play for Gantoise in the Belgian second division. He was immediately promoted and then stayed at Gantoise until 2019 when he joined his current club Royal Daring.

References

External links

1994 births
Living people
Field hockey players from Johannesburg
Field hockey players at the 2020 Summer Olympics
Field hockey players at the 2018 Commonwealth Games
South African male field hockey players
Olympic field hockey players of South Africa
Male field hockey defenders
La Gantoise HC players
Men's Belgian Hockey League players
Royal Daring players
Field hockey players at the 2022 Commonwealth Games
21st-century South African people
2023 Men's FIH Hockey World Cup players